The Farrington Baronetcy, of Blackheath in the County of Kent, is a title in the Baronetage of the United Kingdom. It was created on 2 December 1818 for General Sir Anthony Farrington, 1st Baronet.

Farrington baronets of Blackheath (1818)
Sir Anthony Farrington, 1st Baronet (1742–1823)
Sir Charles Henry Farrington, 2nd Baronet (1794–1828)
Sir Henry Maturin Farrington, 3rd Baronet (1778–1834)
Sir Henry Anthony Farrington, 4th Baronet (1811–1888)
Sir William Hicks Farrington, 5th Baronet (1838–1901)
Sir Henry Anthony Farrington, 6th Baronet (1871–1944)
Sir Henry Francis Colden Farrington, 7th Baronet (1914–2004)
Sir Henry William Farrington, 8th Baronet (born 1951)

The heir apparent to the baronetcy is Henry John Albert Farrington (born 1985), eldest son of the 8th Baronet.

Notes

Farrington